The red serow (Capricornis rubidus), also called the Burmese red serow is a goat-antelope thought to be native to southern Bangladesh and northern Myanmar. It has been sometimes been considered a subspecies of C. sumatraensis. In the northeastern part of India, the red serow occurs widely in the hills south of the Brahmaputra river. although the IUCN states that this species is recorded with certainty only from Myanmar, in Kachin State, and that records in India refer to the Himalayan serow.

References

red serow
Mammals of Bangladesh
Mammals of Myanmar
red serow